Caprica is an American science fiction drama television series.

Caprica may also refer to:

 Caprica, one of the fictional Twelve Colonies of Kobol from the Battlestar Galactica media franchise
 Caprica Six, a copy of the fictional Number Six character from the reimagined Battlestar Galactica

Battlestar Galactica